Kotwali Bazar is a suburb of Dharamshala, situated at the foothills of Dhauladhar mountains, a southern branch of the main Outer Himalayan chain of mountains, in Kangra district in the Indian state of Himachal Pradesh.

Dharamshala
Hill stations in Himachal Pradesh
Tibetan Buddhist places
Tibetan diaspora in India